Storm in a Teacup is an Italian video game developer founded in 2013, based in Rome. The company was founded by Carlo Ivo Alimo Bianchi, an industry veteran.

History 
N.E.R.O .: Nothing Ever Remains Obscure was the first project of the company, presented as a Microsoft Xbox One exclusive at E3 2014 Developed with Unity, the game was released in May 2015 on Xbox One and PlayStation 4 and Steam in 2016. N.E.R.O. has been awarded 2 Drago D’Oro Italian Video Game Awards for the Best Italian Game 2016 and the Best Artistic Direction 2016 and it won the Best Video Game Trailer Award at the Trailers FilmFest 2014.

In 2015 Storm in a Teacup developed ENKI, a first-person horror adventure, featuring multiple endings that provides gamers with a replayable gaming experience. The game was developed with Unreal Engine and published on Steam.

Lantern is the third product of Storm in a Teacup, it aimed virtual reality market thanks to the technology of Oculus Rift and HTC Vive, maintaining a PC gaming experience without virtual reality. It was published by 1C Company on Steam in November 2016.

In 2019 Storm in a Teacup released Close to the Sun, a first person horror adventure set in an alternative late 19th century and involving Nikola Tesla. The game was published by Wired Productions and released as an exclusive on Epic Games Store on May 2, 2019. Console versions followed on October 29, 2019.

Games developed 

N.E.R.O .: Nothing Ever Remains Obscure (2015)
ENKI (2015)
Lantern (2016)
 Close to the Sun (2019)

References

External links 

 Official Website

Video game companies of Italy
Video game development companies
Italian companies established in 2013
Video game companies established in 2013
Privately held companies of Italy
Companies based in Rome